The name Caelius (sometimes spelled Coelius) is an ancient Roman nomen and may refer to:

Caelius Vibenna (8th century BC), a noble Etruscan
Gaius Coelius Caldus or Caelius (2nd–1st century BC), a consul of the Roman Republic
Marcus Caelius Rufus (1st century BC), an orator and politician in the late Roman Republic
Marcus Caelius (45 BC–9 AD), a senior centurion of the Imperial Roman army
Marcus Roscius Caelius (1st century AD), a Roman military officer
Balbinus or Decimus Caelius Calvinus Balbinus (178–238), Roman Emperor
Lactantius or Lucius Caecilius Firmianus Lactantius (250–325), an early Christian author
Caelius Aconius Probianus (fl. 461-471), a politician of the Western Roman Empire
Caelius Sedulius (5th century AD), a Christian poet
Caelius Aurelianus (5th century AD), a Roman physician and writer
Caelius Rhodiginus (1469–1525), a Venetian writer and professor
Caelius Calcagninus (1479-1541), an Italian humanist and scientist
Caelius Secundus Curio (1503–1569), an Italian humanist, editor and historian

Other uses
 Collis Caelius, one of the Seven Hills of Rome, Italy
Psychonotis caelius or the small green banded blue, a species of butterfly of the family Lycaenidae

See also
Caelia gens, a plebeian family at Rome